John Andrew Hull (born November 7, 1986) is an American singer, musician and songwriter. He serves as the lead vocalist, rhythm guitarist, and primary songwriter of the indie rock band Manchester Orchestra. He also has a side project, Right Away, Great Captain!, as well as being co-founder of a side project with his friend and folk musician Kevin Devine by the name of Bad Books. Hull is also co-president of Manchester Orchestra's label, Favorite Gentlemen.

Early life 
Hull was born in Atlanta, Georgia. Hull lived in Richmond Hill, Ontario with his family for seven years before returning to Atlanta when he was 14 years old. His parents bought him a guitar which he taught himself to play. A year later, he began writing and performing songs with a friend who played bass guitar. After that group disbanded, he started another with Manchester Orchestra's keyboard player, Chris Freeman, on drums.

Career 
Hull initially intended Manchester Orchestra to be a solo project, with guest appearances by his friends. "I was listening to a lot of Morrissey and The Smiths," said Hull, "So the city of Manchester really fascinated me, as did the idea of being the leader of an orchestra and having all my friends come in to play."

Feeling increasingly alienated at his "small-town-Georgia, Christian high school" Providence Christian Academy in suburban Atlanta, Hull spent his senior high school year studying at home. He wrote and recorded his first full-length album in 2004 during the same school year.

Hull and Manchester Orchestra guitarist Robert McDowell wrote music for the 2016 film Swiss Army Man. Hull also had a cameo in the film.

Discography
With Manchester Orchestra
5 Stories (2004)
You Brainstorm, I Brainstorm, but Brilliance Needs a Good Editor (2005)
I'm Like a Virgin Losing a Child (2006)
Let My Pride Be What's Left Behind (2008)
Fourteen Years of Excellence (2009)
Mean Everything to Nothing (2009)
Live at Park Ave (2009)
I Could Be the Only One (2010)
Simple Math (2011)
COPE (2014)
HOPE (2014)
A Black Mile to the Surface (2017)
The Million Masks of God (2021)

With Bad Books
Bad Books (2010)
II (2012)
III (2019)

With Right Away, Great Captain!
The Bitter End (2007)
The Eventually Home (2008)
The Church of the Good Thief (2012)
The Lost Sea (2012)

With The Tiger Society
The Tiger Society

With East on Autry
Superhits USA (2004)

Guest appearances
Winston Audio
Keeping It Down
O'Brother
Sputnik
Machines Part I
Easy Talk (Open Your Mouth)
The Dear Hunter
I Couldn't Do It Alone – Red
A Curse of Cynicism – Red
Deny It All – Red
Weatherbox
The Devil And Whom
Frightened Rabbit
Architect
Grouplove
Make It To Me
Bones
TellMeSomethingIDontKnow
Touché Amoré
Limelight
Paris Jackson
Eyelids
Tigers Jaw
I Won't Care How You Remember Me
Every Time I Die
Thing with Feathers
Thrice
Stare at the Sun
Soundtracks
Swiss Army Man (2016)

References

1986 births
Living people
American male singer-songwriters
American singer-songwriters
American indie rock musicians
Musicians from Atlanta
People from Richmond Hill, Ontario
21st-century American singers
21st-century American male singers